James Carter Van Horne (born 1935) is an American economist.

Van Horne completed his bachelor's degree at DePauw University in 1957, followed by master's doctoral degrees at Northwestern University in 1961 and 1964, respectively. In 1965, Van Horne began teaching at the Stanford Graduate School of Business (GSB), where he was later named the A. P. Giannini Professor of Banking and Finance. He served as deputy assistant secretary of the United States Department of the Treasury from 1975 to 1976. Van Horne served as president of the Western Finance Association from 1981-1982. Van Horne was the 1984 president of the American Finance Association. 

In 1982, Van Horne received the school’s inaugural MBA Distinguished Teaching Award. In 1997, he became the first two time recipient. Van Horne was the 1998 recipient of the Robert T. Davis Award for extraordinary faculty contributions. In 2011, the GSB established the James C. Van Horne Professorship in Van Horne's honor. The named professorship was first held by Jeffrey Zwiebel.

Selected publications

References

1935 births
Living people
Stanford University Graduate School of Business faculty
DePauw University alumni
Northwestern University alumni
20th-century American male writers
20th-century American economists
20th-century American writers
Corporate_finance_theorists
Presidents of the American Finance Association